Hilger de Burgis, O. Carm. (died 1452) was a Roman Catholic prelate who served as Auxiliary Bishop of Cologne (1446-1452).

Biography
Hilger de Burgis was appointed a priest in the Order of the Brothers of the Blessed Virgin Mary of Mount Carmel. In 1446, he was appointed during the papacy of Pope Eugene IV as Auxiliary Bishop of Cologne and Titular Bishop of Budua. He served as Auxiliary Bishop of Cologne until his death on 1 Nov 1452.

See also 
Catholic Church in Germany

References

External links and additional sources
 (for Chronology of Bishops) 
 (for Chronology of Bishops)  
 (for Chronology of Bishops) 
 (for Chronology of Bishops)  

15th-century German Roman Catholic bishops
Bishops appointed by Pope Eugene IV
1452 deaths
Carmelite bishops